The Power of the Game is a 2007 documentary directed by Michael Apted. The film shows several stories across the world highlighting the social impact of soccer. The film premiered at the 2007 Tribeca Film Festival.

References

External links

2007 films
2000s English-language films
American sports documentary films
2000s American films